Johannes Schmitt (18 February 1943 – 28 December 2003) was a German athlete, born in Berlin, who competed in the 1964 Summer Olympics.

References

1943 births
2003 deaths
Athletes from Berlin
German male sprinters
Olympic athletes of the United Team of Germany
Athletes (track and field) at the 1964 Summer Olympics
European Athletics Championships medalists
Universiade medalists in athletics (track and field)
Universiade silver medalists for West Germany